Baulenas may refer to:

People
Lluís-Anton Baulenas (born 1958), Spanish novelist
Marta Cuní Baulenas, a competitor in the 2010 Spanish Figure Skating Championships

Other
Baulenas, alternate name of Bolinas, California